Ewald Jarmer (born 12 August 1942) is a German boxer. He competed in the men's middleweight event at the 1972 Summer Olympics. At the 1972 Summer Olympics, he lost to Marvin Johnson of the United States.

References

1942 births
Living people
German male boxers
Olympic boxers of West Germany
Boxers at the 1972 Summer Olympics
People from Svitavy District
Sudeten German people
Middleweight boxers